"Gossip" was digitally released on 1 July 2011. It was slated to be the first single from Vanessa Amorosi's fifth studio album, V, but the album was not released due to poor sales of this and her subsequent single '”Amazing”'.

The song "Gossip" was inspired by nights out partying in London where the girls gossiped in the nightclub bathrooms on websites like Facebook. "These days people are no longer giving out their phone numbers, they are giving out their Facebook names", Amorosi explained. The video clip for "Gossip" was filmed at Melbourne's Labassa mansion by director Stuart Gosling.

Track listing
Music download
"Gossip" – 3:02
CD single (Cat.No. 2778619)
"Gossip" – 3:02
"Gossip" (Macho Psycho Alternate Radio Mix) – 3:59
"Gossip" (Buzz Junkies Remix) – 3:17
"Gossip" (Buzz Junkies Club Mix) – 5:08
Buzz Junkies Remix Single
"Gossip" (Buzz Junkies Remix) – 3:17

Charts
The song was the #1 most added track to Australian radio for the week commencing 11 July 2011.

Release history

References

Sources
 NovaFM Photo Gallery: Behind the scenes of Vanessa Amorosi's "Gossip"
 The Music Network: Vanessa Amorosi aims for social media takeover
 The Music Network: Vanessa Amorosi spreads the Gossip
 SoundCloud: Vanessa Amorosi - Gossip (Stafford Brothers Remix) by staffordbrothers
 SoundCloud: Vanessa Amorosi - Gossip (Buzz Junkies Remix) by buzzjunkies

2011 singles
Vanessa Amorosi songs
Songs written by Vanessa Amorosi
Song recordings produced by MachoPsycho
2011 songs
Universal Music Group singles
Music videos directed by Stuart Gosling